Esmailabad (also Romanized as Esmā‘īlābād) is a village in Ramjerd-e Do Rural District, Dorudzan District, Marvdasht County, Fars Province, Iran. At the 2006 census, its population was 111, in 24 families.

References 

Populated places in Marvdasht County